Sverre Gjørwad (23 November 1885 – 15 July 1969) was a Norwegian politician for the Conservative Party.

He was born in Kviteseid.

He was elected to the Norwegian Parliament from Østfold in 1950, but was not re-elected in 1954. Instead he served in the position of deputy representative during the term 1954–1957.

Gjørwad was a member of the executive committee of Tune municipality between 1947 and 1955.

References

1885 births
1969 deaths
Conservative Party (Norway) politicians
Members of the Storting
20th-century Norwegian politicians
People from Kviteseid